The 1955 Baltimore Colts season was the third season for the team in the National Football League. The Baltimore Colts finished the National Football League's 1955 season with a record of 5 wins, 6 losses and 1 tie and finished fourth in the Western Conference.

Regular season

Schedule

Standings

See also 
History of the Indianapolis Colts
Indianapolis Colts seasons
Colts–Patriots rivalry

Baltimore Colts
1955
Baltimore Colt